Marko Ljubičić (born 23 July 1987) is a Serbian professional basketball player for Vojvodina of the Basketball League of Serbia.

Professional career
Ljubičić was named MVP of the Serbian Super League in 2011. In July 2012, he signed a one-year deal with Cherkasy Monkeys. In January 2014, he returned to Serbia and signed with KK Meridiana. He left them after only one game and signed with Bàsquet Manresa where he stayed for the rest of the season. In September 2014, he returned to his former team Metalac, signing a one-year contract.

In August 2015, he signed with Macedonian club MZT Skopje. For the 2016–17 season he moved to FMP Beograd. In August 2017, he signed with Igokea.

On 4 July 2018 he signed with Cibona.

Ljubičić spent the 2019–20 season with Alba Fehérvár and averaged 11.7 points and 5.9 assists per game. On 11 November 2020 he signed with Podgorica of the Montenegrin First League. In December 2020, he signed with his hometown team Vojvodina.

National team career
Ljubičić was a member of the Serbian university team that won the gold medal at the 2011 Summer Universiade in Shenzhen, China.

References

External links
 aba-liga.com profile
 eurobasket.com profile

1987 births
Living people
ABA League players
Alba Fehérvár players
Basketball League of Serbia players
Bàsquet Manresa players
BC Cherkaski Mavpy players
KK Budućnost players
KK Cibona players
KK FMP players
KK Igokea players
KK Meridiana players
KK Metalac Valjevo players
KK Mladost Zemun players
KK Podgorica players
KK Superfund players
KK Vojvodina players
Liga ACB players
Point guards
Serbian expatriate basketball people in Bosnia and Herzegovina
Serbian expatriate basketball people in Croatia
Serbian expatriate basketball people in Greece
Serbian expatriate basketball people in Hungary
Serbian expatriate basketball people in North Macedonia
Serbian expatriate basketball people in Montenegro
Serbian expatriate basketball people in Spain
Serbian expatriate basketball people in Ukraine
Serbian men's basketball players
Basketball players from Novi Sad
Universiade gold medalists for Serbia
Universiade medalists in basketball
Medalists at the 2011 Summer Universiade